Arthur Paul Nord (25 January 1898 – 4 November 1991) was a Norwegian sport wrestler.

He was born in Kristiania and represented the club Oslo AK. He competed at the 1924 Summer Olympics, when he placed fourth in Greco-Roman wrestling, the featherweight class. He competed at the 1928 Olympics, tying 7th in Freestyle wrestling.

References

External links
 

1898 births
1991 deaths
Sportspeople from Oslo
Olympic wrestlers of Norway
Wrestlers at the 1924 Summer Olympics
Wrestlers at the 1928 Summer Olympics
Norwegian male sport wrestlers
20th-century Norwegian people